Solfrid Lerbrekk  (born 29 November 1990) is a Norwegian politician. 
She was elected representative to the Storting for the period 2017–2021 for the Socialist Left Party.

References

1990 births
Living people
Socialist Left Party (Norway) politicians
Members of the Storting
Rogaland politicians
21st-century Norwegian politicians
21st-century Norwegian women politicians
Women members of the Storting